Scorpaenopsis venosa, the raggy scorpionfish, is a species of venomous marine ray-finned fish belonging to the family Scorpaenidae, the scorpionfishes. This species is found in the Indo-West Pacific.

Size

References

venosa
Taxa named by Georges Cuvier
Fish described in 1829